José Mota may refer to:
José Mota (footballer, born 1919) (1919–?), Portuguese football forward
José Mota (footballer, born 1964), Portuguese football player/manager
José Mota (baseball) (born 1965), Dominican baseball player/broadcaster
José Mota (comedian) (born 1965), Spanish comedian and actor
José Mota (footballer, born 1979), Brazilian football forward